Sunfish Holy Breakfast is an EP by Guided by Voices, a band from Dayton, Ohio. It was released on 19 November 1996.

Track listing
All songs written by Robert Pollard except where noted.
 "Jabberstroker" (Tobin Sprout) – 2:39
 "Stabbing a Star"– 1:41
 "Canteen Plums" – 1:15
 "Beekeeper Seeks Ruth" (R. Pollard, Sprout) – 2:37
 "Cocksoldiers and Their Postwar Stubble" – 3:29
 "A Contest Featuring Human Beings" (R. Pollard, Sprout) – 1:07
 "If We Wait" – 2:53
 "Trendspotter Acrobat" (Jim Greer) – 1:47
 "The Winter Cows" (R. Pollard, Sprout) – 2:04
 "Heavy Metal Country" – 3:16

References

This EP at Guided by Voices Database (Or GBVDB)

1996 EPs
Guided by Voices EPs